This article describes the qualifying for the 2012–13 EHF Women's Champions League.

Qualification tournament
A total of 14 teams took part in the qualification tournaments. The clubs were drawn into three groups of four and played a semifinal and the final. The winner of the qualification groups advanced to the group stage, while the eliminated clubs went to the EHF Cup. Matches were played at 8–9 September 2011. The draw took place on 3 July, at 11:00 local time at Vienna, Austria.

Seedings
The two remaining teams from Pot 1 and 4 played a knock-out match, the winner went into the group stage. The draw was held on 3 July 2012.

Qualification tournament 1
Viborg HK organized the event.

Semifinals

Third place game

Final

Qualification tournament 2
Byåsen HE organized the event.

Semifinals

Third place game

Final

Qualification tournament 3
U Jolidon Cluj-Napoca organized the event.

Semifinals

Third place game

Final

Play-off
IUVENTA Michalovce and FTC-Rail Cargo Hungaria played a playoff series to determine a participant for the group stage.

FTC-Rail Cargo Hungaria wins 71–48 on aggregate.

Wild card tournament
Issy-Paris Hand organized the event.

References

External links
Official website

2012–13 Women's EHF Champions League